Ramond is a surname, and may refer to:
Louis Ramond de Carbonnières (1755–1827), French politician, geologist and botanist, who gave his name to the Société Ramond
Pierre Ramond (born 1943), Distinguished Professor of Physics at University of Florida in Gainesville, Florida